Igor Bobček (born 6 October 1983 in Myjava) is a Slovak ice hockey defenceman who currently plays for CS Progym Gheorgheni in the Erste Liga and the Romanian Hockey League.

Prior to turning professional, Bobček played the 2002–03 season with the Waterloo Black Hawks of the United States Hockey League.

After playing with several clubs outside Slovakia, including GKS Tychy of the Polska Liga Hokejowa, he returned to HK 36 Skalica in December 2012.

References

External links

1983 births
Living people
Bisons de Neuilly-sur-Marne players
Coventry Blaze players
DVTK Jegesmedvék players
ETC Crimmitschau players
GKS Tychy (ice hockey) players
HC Astana players
HC Berounští Medvědi players
HC Kobra Praha players
HK 36 Skalica players
HK Dubnica players
HK Dukla Trenčín players
HK Nitra players
HC Nové Zámky players
LHK Jestřábi Prostějov players
Manchester Storm (2015–) players
MHC Martin players
MHk 32 Liptovský Mikuláš players
MsHK Žilina players
Podhale Nowy Targ players
People from Myjava
Sportspeople from the Trenčín Region
SG Cortina players
Slovak ice hockey defencemen
VHK Vsetín players
Waterloo Black Hawks players
Slovak expatriate ice hockey players in the United States
Slovak expatriate ice hockey players in the Czech Republic
Slovak expatriate ice hockey players in Sweden
Slovak expatriate ice hockey players in Germany
Expatriate ice hockey players in England
Expatriate ice hockey players in Romania
Expatriate ice hockey players in Italy
Expatriate ice hockey players in Austria
Expatriate ice hockey players in Kazakhstan
Expatriate ice hockey players in France
Expatriate ice hockey players in Poland
Slovak expatriate sportspeople in England
Slovak expatriate sportspeople in Romania
Slovak expatriate sportspeople in Italy
Slovak expatriate sportspeople in Austria
Slovak expatriate sportspeople in Kazakhstan
Slovak expatriate sportspeople in France
Slovak expatriate sportspeople in Poland